Karate is a 1983 Indian Hindi-language action film directed by Deb Mukherjee, starring Mithun Chakraborty, Kaajal Kiran, Yogeeta Bali and Mazhar Khan.

Plot 
A scientist creates a diamond that can focus the sun's rays on burning through anything. He hides the diamond in a necklace. Khan (Kader Khan), in a bid to get the diamond, kills the scientist. The scientist's karate-learning sons, Desh (Deb) and Vijay (Mithun), are separated from each other and their mother. Vijay grows up with his karate instructor while Desh is reared at a gypsy camp where he befriends Imran (Mazhar). Khan tracks down the karate instructor who kills himself before Khan could torture him for information about the scientist's missing sons and the necklace. The dying instructor gives the necklace to Vijay, who later gives it to his girlfriend Aarti, who is the instructor's daughter, for safekeeping. Vijay and Aarti raid Khan's illegal godowns and kill many of his men. Desh and Imran have grown up to be master thieves and pickpockets. Khan goes to Aarti's house to kill her and steal the necklace. Aarti jumps out the window using a rope ladder. However, she loses the necklace, which is found by Desh, who is attempting a burglary in the same building. Desh realizes that it is his mother's necklace where his father has hidden the priceless diamond. Khan and his henchman see him stealing the necklace and raid his house while Vijay arrives to save Aarti. Khan and his henchmen and well as Vijay, try to snatch the necklace from Desh, but he escapes and disguises himself as a groom and enters a wedding ceremony. By mistake, Desh marries Geeta, but refuses to acknowledge her as his wife and leaves before even looking at her face. While escaping with the necklace, he is chased by the Police and Vijay, who shoots him. Injured, he seeks asylum at a house which happens to belong to his mother. Khan's henchman tries to kill Desh, who is saved by Geeta. Geeta and Desh escape on a train. The villains also enter the train, and Desh beats them up and escapes again. Desh takes Geeta to the gypsy camp, where she fights with Zora, who is also in love with Desh. Vijay attacks Desh at the gypsy camp, but Imran saves him. Geeta tells Desh that she is the same girl he married, and Desh acknowledges her as his wife. Khan learns that Desh is the lost elder son of the scientist. He learns that Desh loves Imran like his brother and kills Imran in circumstances where Vijay becomes the suspect. Khan also kills Aarti, and Vijay suspects Desh for the murder. Both brothers are after each other's lives. While fighting over the necklace, they realize they are brothers, and Khan has killed Imran and Aarti. Desh and Vijay join hands are decide to avenge their father by killing Khan. Khan organizes a Karate competition and invites the world's most renowned Karate fighters, and pays them to kill the two brothers. During the competition, the two brothers kill all the fighters and Khan and reunite with their mother.

Cast 
Mithun Chakraborty as Vijay
Deb Mukherjee as Desh
Kaajal Kiran as Geeta
Yogeeta Bali as Aarti
Prema Narayan as Zora
Kader Khan as Khan
Mazhar Khan as Imran

Songs

External links

References

1983 films
1980s Hindi-language films
Films scored by Bappi Lahiri
Indian action films
Indian martial arts films
1983 martial arts films
1983 action films